A Camp is the debut album by A Camp, the side project of Nina Persson, vocalist for the popular Swedish indie/pop band The Cardigans. The album garnered critical acclaim from music critics. It produced two singles, "I Can Buy You" (UK No. 46) and "Song for the Leftovers". The album reached No. 87 on the UK Albums Chart.

Critical reception

AllMusic's Tim DiGravina praised the album as "a charming return to basic songcraft and a collaboration that will hopefully bear more fruit in the future" in comparison with Nina Persson's previous work   with the Cardigans. The Guardian's Dave Simpson enthused that "this may well be Persson's best album", and called it "a major work, whatever it sells". Yahoo's Josh Rogan had special praise for producer Mark Linkous, concluding that "Linkous has crafted an album that complements Persson's songs and vision to great effect".

"I Can Buy You" was Record of the Week on Radio 1's Mark and Lard show.

Track listing
All songs by Nina Persson and Niclas Frisk, unless otherwise stated.

"Rock 'n' Roll Ghost" produced by Niclas Frisk. "The Bluest Eyes in Texas" produced by Nathan Larson. All other songs produced by Mark Linkous

Personnel

Musicians 
 Nina Persson – Lead vocals, Jupiter 6, Mellotron, organ & bass pedals
 Nathan Larson – Guitars, Optigan, bass guitar, baritone guitar, piano, organ, synthesizers, and backing vocals
 Mark Linkous – Guitars, Optigan, tweaking, samples, tape manipulation, and backing vocals
 Niclas Frisk – Guitars, piano, harmonica, Mellotron, and backing vocals
 Clayton Doley – Piano, Hammond B3 and Vox organs, Mellotron, and Wurlitzer
 Scott Minor – Sample programming and signal processing
 Karl Berger – String arrangements and conducting
 Andrew Innes – Alto and tenor saxophones
 Al Weatherhead – Bass and slide guitar, mixing
 Kevin March – Drums and percussion
 Niko Rohicke – Pedal steel guitar
 Joan Wasser – Viola and violin
Jason Glasser – Cello
 Miguel Urbiztondo – Drums
 Anders Hernestam – Drums
 Jane Scarpantoni – Cello
 Charlie Malmberg = Piano
 David Knowles – Trumpet
 Anders Paulson – Bass
 Paul Watson – Cornet
 Jess Hoffa – Saw

Production 
 Mixed by Al Weatherhead
 Mastered by Bjorn Engelmann
 Artwork and design by Åbäke

Charts

Weekly charts

Year-end charts

References

A Camp albums
2001 debut albums